NGC 4394 is a SBb barred spiral galaxy in the constellation Coma Berenices and is situated about 39.5 million light-years (12.1 megaparsecs) from Earth. It was discovered on 14 March 1784 by the German–British astronomer William Herschel. It is a presumed companion to the lenticular galaxy M85 / NGC 4382, which lies 8 arc minutes away. It is also a member of the Virgo Cluster.

Gallery

References

External links 
 

40614
7523
Barred spiral galaxies
4394
Virgo Cluster
Coma Berenices